The Divnogorsk constituency (No.56) is a Russian legislative constituency in Krasnoyarsk Krai. The constituency covers southern Krasnoyarsk Krai. 2015 redistricting saw several changes to the constituency, including trade off of Achinsk to Central constituency in exchange for Divnogorsk from Krasnoyarsk constituency.

Members elected

Election results

1993

|-
! colspan=2 style="background-color:#E9E9E9;text-align:left;vertical-align:top;" |Candidate
! style="background-color:#E9E9E9;text-align:left;vertical-align:top;" |Party
! style="background-color:#E9E9E9;text-align:right;" |Votes
! style="background-color:#E9E9E9;text-align:right;" |%
|-
|style="background-color:"|
|align=left|Vasily Zhurko
|align=left|Liberal Democratic Party
|
|32.09%
|-
|style="background-color:#019CDC"|
|align=left|Anna Shurshakova
|align=left|Party of Russian Unity and Accord
| -
|22.10%
|-
| colspan="5" style="background-color:#E9E9E9;"|
|- style="font-weight:bold"
| colspan="3" style="text-align:left;" | Total
| 
| 100%
|-
| colspan="5" style="background-color:#E9E9E9;"|
|- style="font-weight:bold"
| colspan="4" |Source:
|
|}

1995

|-
! colspan=2 style="background-color:#E9E9E9;text-align:left;vertical-align:top;" |Candidate
! style="background-color:#E9E9E9;text-align:left;vertical-align:top;" |Party
! style="background-color:#E9E9E9;text-align:right;" |Votes
! style="background-color:#E9E9E9;text-align:right;" |%
|-
|style="background-color:#2C299A"|
|align=left|Valery Sergiyenko
|align=left|Congress of Russian Communities
|
|32.56%
|-
|style="background-color:"|
|align=left|Valery Kolmakov
|align=left|Independent
|
|25.74%
|-
|style="background-color:"|
|align=left|Vasily Zhurko (incumbent)
|align=left|Liberal Democratic Party
|
|13.43%
|-
|style="background-color:"|
|align=left|Lilia Skolkova
|align=left|Independent
|
|11.93%
|-
|style="background-color:#000000"|
|colspan=2 |against all
|
|14.38%
|-
| colspan="5" style="background-color:#E9E9E9;"|
|- style="font-weight:bold"
| colspan="3" style="text-align:left;" | Total
| 
| 100%
|-
| colspan="5" style="background-color:#E9E9E9;"|
|- style="font-weight:bold"
| colspan="4" |Source:
|
|}

1999

|-
! colspan=2 style="background-color:#E9E9E9;text-align:left;vertical-align:top;" |Candidate
! style="background-color:#E9E9E9;text-align:left;vertical-align:top;" |Party
! style="background-color:#E9E9E9;text-align:right;" |Votes
! style="background-color:#E9E9E9;text-align:right;" |%
|-
|style="background-color:"|
|align=left|Sergey Generalov
|align=left|Independent
|
|23.12%
|-
|style="background-color:"|
|align=left|Oleg Pashchenko
|align=left|Independent
|
|18.25%
|-
|style="background-color:"|
|align=left|Valery Sergiyenko (incumbent)
|align=left|Independent
|
|16.72%
|-
|style="background-color:"|
|align=left|Valery Barmin
|align=left|Independent
|
|11.56%
|-
|style="background-color:#FF4400"|
|align=left|Anatoly Nazeykin
|align=left|Andrey Nikolayev and Svyatoslav Fyodorov Bloc
|
|3.26%
|-
|style="background-color:"|
|align=left|Vasily Zhurko
|align=left|Independent
|
|2.04%
|-
|style="background-color:#000000"|
|colspan=2 |against all
|
|23.05%
|-
| colspan="5" style="background-color:#E9E9E9;"|
|- style="font-weight:bold"
| colspan="3" style="text-align:left;" | Total
| 
| 100%
|-
| colspan="5" style="background-color:#E9E9E9;"|
|- style="font-weight:bold"
| colspan="4" |Source:
|
|}

2003

|-
! colspan=2 style="background-color:#E9E9E9;text-align:left;vertical-align:top;" |Candidate
! style="background-color:#E9E9E9;text-align:left;vertical-align:top;" |Party
! style="background-color:#E9E9E9;text-align:right;" |Votes
! style="background-color:#E9E9E9;text-align:right;" |%
|-
|style="background-color:"|
|align=left|Aleksandr Klyukin
|align=left|United Russia
|
|30.12%
|-
|style="background-color:"|
|align=left|Yevgeny Vasilyev
|align=left|Independent
|
|23.24%
|-
|style="background-color:"|
|align=left|Oleg Pashchenko
|align=left|Agrarian Party
|
|9.97%
|-
|style="background-color:"|
|align=left|Vladimir Dmitriyevsky
|align=left|Liberal Democratic Party
|
|5.99%
|-
|style="background-color:"|
|align=left|Valery Kolmakov
|align=left|Independent
|
|2.05%
|-
|style="background-color:#7C73CC"|
|align=left|Anatoly Sidorov
|align=left|Great Russia – Eurasian Union
|
|1.50%
|-
|style="background-color:#000000"|
|colspan=2 |against all
|
|22.74%
|-
| colspan="5" style="background-color:#E9E9E9;"|
|- style="font-weight:bold"
| colspan="3" style="text-align:left;" | Total
| 
| 100%
|-
| colspan="5" style="background-color:#E9E9E9;"|
|- style="font-weight:bold"
| colspan="4" |Source:
|
|}

2016

|-
! colspan=2 style="background-color:#E9E9E9;text-align:left;vertical-align:top;" |Candidate
! style="background-color:#E9E9E9;text-align:left;vertical-align:top;" |Party
! style="background-color:#E9E9E9;text-align:right;" |Votes
! style="background-color:#E9E9E9;text-align:right;" |%
|-
|style="background-color: " |
|align=left|Viktor Zubarev
|align=left|United Russia
|
|40.95%
|-
|style="background-color:"|
|align=left|Dmitry Nosov
|align=left|Communist Party
|
|17.31%
|-
|style="background-color:"|
|align=left|Roman Ulskikh
|align=left|Liberal Democratic Party
|
|9.85%
|-
|style="background-color:"|
|align=left|Gennady Semigin
|align=left|Patriots of Russia
|
|8.71%
|-
|style="background:"| 
|align=left|Irina Ivanova
|align=left|Communists of Russia
|
|6.15%
|-
|style="background-color:"|
|align=left|Maksim Zolotukhin
|align=left|A Just Russia
|
|4.87%
|-
|style="background-color: " |
|align=left|Yaroslav Pitersky
|align=left|Yabloko
|
|2.59%
|-
|style="background-color:"|
|align=left|Sergey Yerbyagin
|align=left|The Greens
|
|2.23%
|-
|style="background-color: "|
|align=left|Valentina Ulyanova
|align=left|Civic Platform
|
|1.59%
|-
| colspan="5" style="background-color:#E9E9E9;"|
|- style="font-weight:bold"
| colspan="3" style="text-align:left;" | Total
| 
| 100%
|-
| colspan="5" style="background-color:#E9E9E9;"|
|- style="font-weight:bold"
| colspan="4" |Source:
|
|}

2021

|-
! colspan=2 style="background-color:#E9E9E9;text-align:left;vertical-align:top;" |Candidate
! style="background-color:#E9E9E9;text-align:left;vertical-align:top;" |Party
! style="background-color:#E9E9E9;text-align:right;" |Votes
! style="background-color:#E9E9E9;text-align:right;" |%
|-
|style="background-color: " |
|align=left|Viktor Zubarev (incumbent)
|align=left|United Russia
|
|34.38%
|-
|style="background-color:"|
|align=left|Boris Melnichenko
|align=left|Communist Party
|
|28.42%
|-
|style="background-color: " |
|align=left|Vladimir Katsaurov
|align=left|New People
|
|7.82%
|-
|style="background:"| 
|align=left|Oleg Lyutykh
|align=left|Communists of Russia
|
|7.78%
|-
|style="background-color:"|
|align=left|Yaroslav Khavron
|align=left|Liberal Democratic Party
|
|6.98%
|-
|style="background-color:"|
|align=left|Sergey Kornyushkin
|align=left|A Just Russia — For Truth
|
|5.47%
|-
|style="background-color: "|
|align=left|Leonid Fedotenko
|align=left|Party of Pensioners
|
|4.17%
|-
| colspan="5" style="background-color:#E9E9E9;"|
|- style="font-weight:bold"
| colspan="3" style="text-align:left;" | Total
| 
| 100%
|-
| colspan="5" style="background-color:#E9E9E9;"|
|- style="font-weight:bold"
| colspan="4" |Source:
|
|}

Notes

References

Russian legislative constituencies
Politics of Krasnoyarsk Krai